The 2011 Federation Tournament of Champions took place at the Times Union Center in downtown Albany on March 25, 26 and 27. It was the tournament's first year in Albany after 30 years in Glens Falls. Federation championships were awarded in the AA, A and B classifications. Mount Vernon won the Class AA championship. Jabarie Hinds of Mount Vernon was named the Class AA tournament's Most Valuable Player.

Class AA 

Participating teams, results and individual honors in Class AA were as follows:

Participating teams

Results 

Mount Vernon finished the season with a 23-5 record.

Individual honors 

The following players were awarded individual honors for their performances at the Federation Tournament:

Most Valuable Player 

 Jabarie Hinds, Mount Vernon

All-Tournament Team 

 Omar Calhoun, Christ the King
 Isaiah Cousins, Mount Vernon
 Chris Ortiz, Christ the King
 Khalid Samuels, Mount Vernon
 Mike Taylor, Boys and Girls

Sportsmanship Award 

 T.J. Curry, Christ the King

Class A 

Participating teams, results and individual honors in Class A were as follows:

Participating teams

Results 

Long Island Lutheran finished the season with a 23-4 record.

Individual honors 

The following players were awarded individual honors for their performances at the Federation Tournament:

Most Valuable Player 

 Achraf Yacoubou, Long Island Lutheran

All-Tournament Team 

 DaJuan Coleman, Jamesville-DeWitt
 Mike Florin, Long Island Lutheran 
 Shaun Lawton, Long Island Lutheran
 Chavaughn Lewis, St. Mary's
 Enees Nikovic, Midwood

Sportsmanship Award 

 Charles McCann, St. Mary's

Class B 

Participating teams, results and individual honors in Class B were as follows:

Participating teams

Results 

Collegiate finished the season with a 22-8 record. It was Collegiate's record fourth straight state title.

Individual honors 

The following players were awarded individual honors for their performances at the Federation Tournament:

Most Valuable Player 

 Connor Huff, Collegiate

All-Tournament Team 

 Ryan Frankel, Collegiate
 Kevin Punter, Salesian
 Zach Ruffer, Burke Catholic
 Jordan Washington, Pathways
 Rob Wechsler, Collegiate

Sportsmanship Award 

 Jason Alleyne, Salesian

External links 

 http://www.nysbasketballbrackets.com/

References 

High school basketball competitions in the United States
High school sports in New York (state)
Sports competitions in Albany, New York
Basketball competitions in New York (state)
High
New York
New York state high school boys basketball championships